| tries ={{#expr: 
 + 5 + 7
 + 8 + 5
 + 8 + 3
}}
| top point scorer    = 
| top try scorer      = 
| venue               = 
| attendance2         = 
| champions           = 
| count               = 1
| runner-up           = 
| website             = IRB Nations Cup
| previous year       = 
| previous tournament = 
| next year           = 2007
| next tournament     = 2007 IRB Nations Cup
}}
The 2006 IRB Nations Cup was the first edition of the international rugby union tournament, a competition created by the International Rugby Board.  It pits the "A" Teams of the stronger (Tier 1) rugby nations (Argentina Jaguars and Italy A) against some of the Tier 2 and 3 nations (Romania and Russia).

The tournament took place between 13–24 June at Estádio Universitário in Lisbon, Portugal.  Argentina Jaguars were the overall winners.

The competition format was a round-robin whereby each team played each of the other 3 teams once.  The competition was played over three match days, with two matches played consecutively on each day.

Final standings

Results

Round 1
IRB Report

Round 2
IRB Report

Round 3
IRB Report

See also 

2006 IRB Pacific 5 Nations

References

External links
IRB preview

2006
2006 rugby union tournaments for national teams
International rugby union competitions hosted by Portugal
2005–06 in Italian rugby union
2006 in Russian rugby union
2006 in Argentine rugby union
2006 in Portuguese sport
Sports competitions in Lisbon
June 2006 sports events in Europe
2000s in Lisbon